The Lausanne–Nescopeck Turnpike or Susquehanna & Lehigh Turnpike (1804–1840s) also mentioned often as the Lehigh–Susquehanna Turnpike (or Lehigh & Susquehanna Turnpike) and opened in 1805 was a highly profitable foot traffic toll road established during the earliest days of the American canal age—one of the many privately funded road (and transport infrastructure) projects established after the 1790s in the first years of the young United States era to open up and promote growth along either side of the American Frontiers by building connecting transport infrastructure.  To the new Homesteader, a road meant a way to send excess product east for monies, a way to buy necessaries and desired goods to ease the strains of a hard life. The needs of the easterners left behind were for foods, raw materials, while to the manufacturing industrialists, the settlers represented a market in need of their wares. Both needed a way to convey their respective needs, and the manifold ways such needs are slaked are what makes commerce superior to barter.

Like many others of the era, the toll road consisted generally of improvements along the path of an ancient Susquehannock Amerindian trail traveling generally south-southeast to north-northwest across the parallel barrier ridges and steep valleys in the Ridge and Valley Appalachians connecting the center waters of the Lehigh River valley on the opposite shore from the Lehigh Gorge exit to Nescopeck, Pennsylvania (and Berwick on the opposite shore of the (Main Branch) Susquehanna River. Ultimately Berwick to Tioga & Elmira, New York would be connected via the Susquehanna & Tioga Turnpike which was purpose built to provide communication from the cities and towns along the Delaware River including communities in New Jersey and Delaware in the Delaware Valley and Philadelphia and Buffalo, New York

beginning from Lausanne Landing (and Landing Tavern), at the mouth of Nesquehoning Creek along the southeastern escarpment of Broad Mountain descending into and through Weatherly, thence up the Hazel Creek across the drainage divide in the saddle hosting Hazleton, Pennsylvania, then proceeding along more westerly in a descent from the highland paths down traverses of a string of valleys near or through the Nescopeck Creek valley.

The continuation, starting with a ferry across the Susquehanna between Nescopeck and Berwick was chartered in 1805 as the Susquehanna & Tioga Turnpike connecting through Tioga, Elmira to Buffalo, connecting communities along the Lehigh & Delaware Valleys in New Jersey, Delaware, as well as America's largest city of the era, Philadelphia to Lake Erie—so the American far west of the day, Minnesota, Wisconsin and Chicago.

See also
 Pennsylvania Route 93: runs along the same transportation corridor, though parts are now straightened and displaced parallel to the old turnpike trail since the modern road has cuttings not possible to the 19th-century settlers.
 Susquehanna & Tioga Turnpike (1806): in what might be considered a cross-river continuation, the separate corporation starting NNW from Berwick across the fiver from Nescopeck connect the Turnpike and the Lehigh and Delaware River valley communities to the Great Lakes at Lake Erie via Elmira, New York.

Notelist

References

History of Pennsylvania
History of Carbon County, Pennsylvania
History of Luzerne County, Pennsylvania
Former toll roads in Pennsylvania
Transportation in Carbon County, Pennsylvania
Transportation in Luzerne County, Pennsylvania
1804 establishments in Pennsylvania
Historic sites in Pennsylvania
Defunct organizations based in Pennsylvania
Demolished buildings and structures in Pennsylvania
Historic American Buildings Survey in Pennsylvania